Dahod district is a district of Gujarat state in western India. This largely tribal district is mostly covered by forests and hills.

Geography 
Dahod is located in eastern Gujarat. It is located at the tripoint between Gujarat, Rajasthan and Madhya Pradesh. It borders Rajasthan to the north, Madhya Pradesh to the east, Chhota Udaipur district to the south, Panchmahal district to the west and Mahisagar district to the north. The district has two areas: a region of scrubland in the western part of the district and hills in the east. All these areas are covered by forests. The district has several rivers flowing through it: the Panam, Khan, Kalutari, Machhan and Anas. These rivers are tributaries of the Mahi.

History 
Aurangzeb was born in Dahod in 1648.

Before Indian independence in 1948, Dahod district was part of the Sunth princely state. In October and November 1913 its villages were raided by the Bhils under Govindgiri who were encamped in the Mangarh Hills to the northeast.

Demographics 

It was 8.99% urban at the 2001 census. The population of the district is mostly rural, and a majority of the district's residents are tribals, mostly Bhils. Dahod District also has the second largest population of the Dawoodi Bohra sect of Ismā'īlī Muslims in India.

At the 2011 census Dahod District had a population of 2,127,086, roughly equal to the nation of Namibia or the US state of New Mexico. It was the 215th most populous district in India (out of a total of 640). Its population growth rate over the decade 2001–2011 was 29.95%. It had a sex ratio of 986 females for every 1000 males, and a literacy rate of 60.6%. 9.01% of the population lived in urban areas. Scheduled Castes and Scheduled Tribes made up 1.95% and 74.32% of the population respectively.

At the time of the 2011 Census of India, 96.29% of the population in the district spoke Gujarati, 2.14% Bhili and 1.18% Hindi as their first language.

Politics
  

|}

Education 
There is a government polytechnic college since 1963 and it was started by Indian prime minister Mr. Moraraji Desai and now government degree engineering college is also there. The degree college is affiliated to Gujarat University.

Economy 
In 2006, the Ministry of Panchayati Raj named Dahod one of the country's 250 most backward districts (out of a total of 640). It is one of the six districts in Gujarat currently receiving funds from the Backward Regions Grant Fund Programme (BRGF).

Ratan Mahal Sanctuary 

Ratanmahal Wildlife Sanctuary is a mixed, deciduous forest, located near Devgadh Baria in Dohad district, at Gujarat's border with Madhya Pradesh, within the Kathiawar-Gir dry deciduous forests' ecoregion. The maximum area covered is in Gujarat. Ratanmahal Sanctuary is near by River Paanam (a major river of Central Gujarat), which helps to preserve the ecological balance in the forest, besides water conservation. The sanctuary is also known as "Ratanmahal Sloth Bear Sanctuary," due to its population of sloth bears. As with Purna Wildlife Sanctuary, Ratanmahal has experienced extinctions in its population of birds.

See also 
 Forest of the Dangs
 List of protected areas of Gujarat
 Gir
 Jessore
 Shoolpaneshwar

References

External links 

 Dahod Darpan
 Dahod Online 

Khathiar-Gir dry deciduous forests
Dahod
Districts of Gujarat
1997 establishments in Gujarat